Harold Francis Woods (3 September 1903 – c. 1972) was a rugby union player who represented Australia.

Woods, a prop, was born in Boulder, Western Australia and claimed a total of 8 international rugby caps for Australia.

References

Published sources
 Howell, Max (2006) Born to Lead – Wallaby Test Captains (2005) Celebrity Books, New Zealand

Australian rugby union players
Australia international rugby union players
1903 births
1972 deaths
Rugby union players from Western Australia
Rugby union props
People from Boulder, Western Australia